Kelley Nunatak is a nunatak on the north side of Leverett Glacier in Antarctica,  northeast of Mount Gould. It was mapped by the United States Geological Survey from ground surveys and U.S. Navy air photos, 1960–63, and was named by the Advisory Committee on Antarctic Names for Herbert O. Kelley, a radioman with the Byrd Station winter party in 1958.

References

Nunataks of Marie Byrd Land